Noi donne siamo fatte così (internationally released as That's How We Women Are) is a 1971 Italian anthology comedy film directed by Dino Risi. The film consists of twelve segments, all starring Monica Vitti.

Cast 
 Monica Vitti: la suonatrice di piatti, Zoe, Annunziata, Teresa, Alberta, Eliana, Katherine, Erika, Palmira, Agata, Laura, Fulvia 
 Carlo Giuffré: Ferdinando, marito di Alberta 
 Enrico Maria Salerno: Ivano, compagno di viaggio di Zoe 
 Ettore Manni: suonatore, compagno di Teresa  
 Greta Vayan 
 Renzo Marignano 
 Clara Colosimo

References

External links

1971 films
Commedia all'italiana
Films directed by Dino Risi
Films scored by Armando Trovajoli
Italian anthology films
1971 comedy films
Films set in Rome
Films set in Naples
Films set in Veneto
1970s Italian-language films
1970s Italian films